Milenge may refer to:

 Milenge, Zambia
 Milenge District, Zambia
 Milenge Milenge, a 2010 Indian Hindi film

See also
 Phir Milenge (disambiguation)